The Chinese Taipei men's national basketball team is the men's basketball team representing the Republic of China on Taiwan in international competitions, organised and run by the Chinese Taipei Basketball Association (CTBA). The team was known as Formosa prior to the implementation of the Nagoya Resolution in 1981.

Led by team leader, Yi Kuo-juei, Chinese Taipei's fourth-place finish at the 1959 FIBA World Championship is the second best finish of an Asian team at the World Championship, only behind the Philippines' third-place finish at the 1954 FIBA World Championship.

Competitions

Summer Olympics

FIBA Basketball World Cup

FIBA Asia Cup

William Jones Cup
 2001 – Champions
 2004 – Champions

Team

Current roster

2021 FIBA Asia Cup qualification

Opposition: Malaysia  (February 21)
Venue: Heping Basketball Gymnasium, Taipei
Opposition: Japan  (February 24)
Venue: Heping Basketball Gymnasium, Taipei

Past roster

Roster for the 2017 FIBA Asia Cup.

Depth chart

Head coach history 

  Niu Bing-yi – 1960
  Chen Tsu-li – 1987
  Liu Chun-Ching – 1989
  Ku Chi-Hsiung – 1997
  Chung Chih-Meng – 1998
  Chien Yi-Fei – 1999–2002
  Lee Ching-Chi – 2003
  Lee Yun-Kwang – 2004–2006
  Chung Kwang-Suk – 2007–2009
   Zhang Xue-Lei – 2009–2010
  Chou Chun-San – 2011, 2015, 2017
  Hsu Jin-Che – 2012–2014
  Yan Chia-Hua – 2016
  Charlie Parker – 2018–present

See also
Chinese Taipei women's national basketball team
Chinese Taipei national under-19 basketball team
Chinese Taipei national under-17 basketball team
Chinese Taipei national 3x3 team

References

External links
Official website
FIBA profile
Team participation at archive.fiba.com
Asia-basket – Chinese Taipei Men National Team

Videos
 Japan v Chinese Taipei - Highlights - FIBA Basketball World Cup 2019 - Asian Qualifiers Youtube.com video

 
1913 establishments in China